Rocky River High School may refer to:
Rocky River High School (North Carolina) in Mint Hill, North Carolina
Rocky River High School (Ohio) in Rocky River, Ohio